Yana Valeryevna Martynova (born 3 February 1988, in Kazan) is a Russian swimmer who competes in the Women's 400m individual medley. At the 2004 Summer Olympics she competed in the women's 400 m individual medley, finishing in 21st place.  At the 2008 Olympics, she competed in the 400 m individual medley and the 200 m butterfly.  She reached the final of the 400 m individual medley.  At the 2012 Summer Olympics she finished 24th overall in the heats in the Women's 400 metre individual medley and failed to reach the final.

References

External links
 

Russian female butterfly swimmers
1988 births
Living people
Olympic swimmers of Russia
Swimmers at the 2004 Summer Olympics
Swimmers at the 2008 Summer Olympics
Swimmers at the 2012 Summer Olympics
Russian female medley swimmers
European Aquatics Championships medalists in swimming
World Aquatics Championships medalists in swimming
Universiade medalists in swimming
Universiade gold medalists for Russia
Universiade bronze medalists for Russia
Medalists at the 2013 Summer Universiade